Estanys de Baiau is a pair of lakes in Catalonia, Spain approximately 1 kilometre from the border with Andorra. The lakes are surrounded by several notable Pyrenean mountains, including Pic de Baiau and Coma Pedrosa—the highest mountain in Andorra—to the east, and Pic de Sanfonts to the south. They are both drained by Riu de Baiau, a tributary of the Barranc d'Arcalís.

The hiking path GR 11 follows the northern side of the lakes, passing Refugi de Baiau, before splitting in GR11.1 taking the easier path north of Pic de Comapedrosa, or GR11 for a steep 300m climb up loose rocks to Port de Baiau at 2800m where there is a sidepath to the top of Pic de Comapedrosa, or continue for a then easier hiking path down to Arinsal passing Refugi de Comapedrosa.

References

Baiau
Andorra–Spain border
Baiau